Preda is a locality in Graubünden, Switzerland.

Preda may also refer to:

 Preda railway station, a Rhaetian Railway station in Preda, Switzerland
 PREDA Foundation, a charitable organization based in the Philippines

People

Surname 
 Ambrogio Preda (1839-1906), Italian painter
 Cristian Preda (born 1966), Romanian professor and politician
 Danny Preda (born 1987), Israeli footballer
 Mariana Preda (born 1994), Romanian pan flute musician
 Marin Preda (1922–1980), Romanian novelist
 Roberto Preda, Italian sports shooter
 Savo Pređa, Serbian Partisan general in World War II
 Ştefan Preda (born 1970), Romanian footballer
 Terezia Preda (born 1956), Romanian archer
 Valentin Preda (born 1985), Romanian swimmer
 Virgil Preda (1923–2011), Romanian painter

Given name 
 Preda Mihăilescu (born 1955), Romanian mathematician

Romanian-language surnames
Romanian masculine given names